Riley Township is located in McHenry County, Illinois. As of the 2020 census, its population was 3,035 and it contained 1,070 housing units.

Geography

Demographics

References

External links
City-data.com
Illinois State Archives

Townships in McHenry County, Illinois
Townships in Illinois